Kerman County is in Kerman province, Iran. The capital of the county is the city of Kerman. At the 2006 census, the county's population was 654,052 in 166,740 households. The following census in 2011 counted 722,484 people in 199,138 households. At the 2016 census, the county's population was 738,724 in 222,356 households.  It is the largest county in the province by area.

Administrative divisions

The population history of Kerman County's administrative divisions over three consecutive censuses is shown in the following table. The latest census shows six districts, 16 rural districts, and 13 cities.

References

 
Counties of Kerman Province